Ramenye is a rural locality (a village) in Mstyora Urban Settlement, Vyaznikovsky District, Vladimir Oblast, Russia. The population was 119 as of 2010. There are 2 streets.

Geography 
Ramenye is located 25 km northwest of Vyazniki (the district's administrative centre) by road. Chernomorye is the nearest rural locality.

References 

Rural localities in Vyaznikovsky District